Tuyam Island is an island on the southern side of East Channel, Milne Bay Province, Papua New Guinea.

Administration 
The island belongs to Logea South Ward, Bwanabwana Rural Local Level Government Area LLG, Samarai-Murua District, which are in Milne Bay Province.

Geography 
The island is part of the Doini group, itself a part of Samarai Islands of the Louisiade Archipelago.

Economy 
The island is privately owned, belonging to the owner of Doini Island.

References

Islands of Milne Bay Province
Louisiade Archipelago